State Route 219 (SR 219) is an east–west state highway in the western portion of the U.S. state of Ohio. The eastern terminus of State Route 219 is at a diamond interchange with Interstate 75 at its Exit 104 in Botkins.

Route description
Along its path, State Route 219 traverses portions of Mercer, Auglaize and Shelby Counties.  There are no parts of this state highway that are included within the National Highway System, a system of routes deemed most imperative for the nation's economy, mobility and defense.

History
When it was first designated in 1925, SR 219 was routed between its current western terminus at the Indiana State Line and its junction with SR 66.  In 1937, SR 219 was extended east to a new endpoint at what was US 25.

Following completion of Interstate 75 through northern Shelby County and southern Auglaize County in 1962, U.S. Route 25 was re-routed onto the new freeway, and SR 219 was extended.  From its former eastern terminus, it was routed south along the former US 25 into Botkins, then east along County Road 22 to a new terminus at a diamond interchange with the new freeway.

By 1973, SR 219 experienced a re-routing through eastern Mercer County.  The designation was removed from what is now County Road 219A, and applied to what was a former eastern extension of SR 703 along the south side of Grand Lake Saint Marys between the Burge Road intersection and the Mercer-Auglaize County Line.  Jurisdiction of the former southerly routing of SR 219 was turned over to Mercer County, and the aforementioned designation of County Road 219A was applied to it.

Major intersections

References

External links

State Route 219 Endpoint Photos

219
Transportation in Mercer County, Ohio
Transportation in Auglaize County, Ohio
Transportation in Shelby County, Ohio